Uljaste Landscape Conservation Area is a nature park which is located in Lääne-Viru County, Estonia.

The protected area was founded in 1959 to protect Uljaste Lake and Uljaste Esker. In 2017, the protected area was designated to the landscape conservation area.

References

Nature reserves in Estonia
Geography of Lääne-Viru County